Coleophora himyarita is a moth of the family Coleophoridae. It is found in Yemen.

The wingspan is about 8 mm.

References

himyarita
Moths described in 2007
Moths of the Arabian Peninsula